Cederwall is a surname. Notable people with the surname include:

Bengt Cederwall (born 1929), Swedish curler
Brian Cederwall (born 1952), New Zealand rugby union player
Grant Cederwall (born 1959), New Zealand cricketer and rugby union player
Peter Cederwall (born 1954), Swedish curler

Surnames